The rhythmic gymnastics events at the 2005 World Games in Duisburg was played between 20 and 21 July. 22 rhythmic gymnastics competitors, from 18 nations, participated in the tournament. The rhythmic gymnastics competition took place at Theater am Marientor.

Participating nations

Medal table

Events

References

External links
 Fédération Internationale de Gymnastique
 Gymnastics on IWGA website
 Results

 
2005 World Games
World Games